Blomosuchus is an extinct genus of archosauriform from the Early Triassic of Russia. The type species was named in 1992 as Blomia georgii. However, the name Blomia was preoccupied by a genus of mites in the family Glycyphagidae (Blomia), so the genus was renamed Blomosuchus in 1997. Fossils of Blomosuchus have been found along the Vetluga River besides fossils of another problematic archosauriform, Vonhuenia (both were named in a 1992 study of Triassic fossils from Russia).

References

Early Triassic reptiles of Europe
Prehistoric reptile genera
Prehistoric archosauriforms